Brighouse Town AFC Women Football Club is a women's football team in England founded in 2013. They play in the FA Women's National League North (tier 3), following their successful application for promotion in the 2020-21 season.
They are managed by Rob Mitchell

They play their home games at the Yorkshire Payments Stadium.

References

Women's football clubs in England
Association football clubs established in 2013